The 2019 Torneo di Viareggio is the 71st edition of Torneo di Viareggio, an annual youth football tournament held in Viareggio, Tuscany.

Format 
The 40 teams are seeded in 10 groups, 5 groups in pool A and 5 groups in pool B. Each team from a group meets the others in a single tie. The winning club from each group and six best runners-up progress to the knockout stage. All matches in the final rounds are single tie. During the round of 16 no extra time will be played in case of a draw, with the match proceeding immediately to penalty kicks. From the quarterfinals on, matches include 30 minutes extra time and penalties to be played if the draw between teams still holds.

Participating teams
40 teams participate in the tournament. The list of the teams are below.

Italian teams

  Ascoli
  Benevento
  Bologna
  Cagliari
  Carrarese
  Empoli
  Fiorentina
  Genoa
  Inter Milan
  Livorno
  Milan
  Parma
  Perugia
  Pontedera
  Rieti
  Salernitana
  Sassuolo
  Serie D Representatives
  SPAL
  Spezia
  Ternana
  Torino
  Venezia
  Viareggio

European teams

  Club Brugge
  Dukla Prague
  Nordsjælland
  Norchi Dinamo
  FK RFS
  Braga
  Krasnodar

American teams

  Athletico Paranaense
  Atlántida Juniors
  LIAC New York
  UYSS New York
  Westchester United

African teams

  Berekum Chelsea
  Nania

Asian/Oceanian teams

  APIA Leichhardt Tigers
  China U-19

Group stage

Pool A

Group 1

Group 2

Group 3

Group 4

Group 5

Pool B

Group 6

Group 7

Group 8

Group 9

Group 10

Knockout stage

References

External links
 Official Site (Italian) 

2019
2018–19 in Italian football
2018–19 in European football
2018–19 in CONCACAF football
2019 in South American football
2019 in African football
March 2019 sports events in Italy